Bombings of Vatican City occurred twice during World War II. The first occasion was on the evening of 5 November 1943, when a plane dropped bombs on the area south-west of St. Peter's Basilica, causing considerable damage but no casualties. The second bombing, which affected only the outer margin of the city, was at about the same hour on 1 March 1944, and killed one person and injured another.

Circumstances 

Vatican City was neutral throughout the war. Both Allied and Axis aircraft crews were generally commanded with general orders to respect its neutrality even when bombing Rome.

On 25 July 1943, after Allied forces had conquered the Italian possessions in Africa and had taken Sicily, the Fascist Grand Council removed Benito Mussolini from power. The Kingdom of Italy at first remained an ally of Nazi Germany, but in less than two months secured an armistice with the Allies, signed on 3 September and announced on 8 September. Germany, which had discovered what was afoot, quickly intervened and took military control of most of Italy, including Rome, freed Mussolini and brought him to the German-occupied area to establish a puppet regime known as the Italian Social Republic.

Both bombings occurred while Rome was under German occupation.

Bombing of 5 November 1943

Account by Tardini 

An eyewitness account written in 1944 by Monsignor Domenico Tardini, an Italian priest and later a cardinal, states:

He continued:

Statement by Carroll 

The message from Carroll of which Tardini wrote as being addressed to Montini was in reality addressed to Luigi Maglione, Cardinal Secretary of State. It read: 

Official assurance that no American plane had in fact dropped bombs on Vatican City was given by the United States authorities.

The German and British authorities gave similar assurances regarding aircraft of their countries. Aware that the bombs used were British, the British pointed out that this proved nothing as they could have been taken from captured ordnance, and used for precisely that purpose.

Recent books 

Augusto Ferrara's 2010 book 1943 Bombe sul Vaticano, declares that the attack was orchestrated  by leading Italian Fascist politician and anti-clericalist Roberto Farinacci. The aim was to knock out Vatican Radio, which was suspected of sending coded messages to the Allies. The aircraft that delivered the bombs was a SIAI Marchetti S.M.79, a three-engined Italian medium bomber known as the "Sparviero", which had taken off from Viterbo, some 80 kilometres north of Rome.

One piece of evidence on which Ferrara bases his account of the responsibility of Farinacci was a telephone call from a priest called Giuseppe to the Jesuit Pietro Tacchi Venturi. In fact, a note on page 705 of volume 7 of the Actes et documents du Saint Siège relatifs à la seconde guerre mondiale cites Eitel Friederich Moellhausen as stating that rumours in Rome immediately blamed Farinacci and spoke of Viterbo as the base from which the plane must have flown. Tardini's note quoted above also says that, from the start, it was the general opinion that the Italian Republican Fascists were to blame, a view that Tardini himself discounted on the basis of the information given by Monsignor Carroll. Owen Chadwick also reported that Farinacci was rumoured in Rome to have arranged the raid from the Viterbo airfield, something that Farinacci, who was killed together with Mussolini on 28 April 1945, never denied, but Chadwick considered the story "very unlikely".

In Ferrara's account, five bombs were dropped, of which one did not explode. According to the Actes et documents du Saint Siège relatifs à la seconde guerre mondiale, the report of an examination carried out by Vatican authorities after the event spoke only of fragments that made it difficult to determine whether the high-explosive bombs, which had been of 100–150 kg weight and produced small craters over a wide range, were of British, German or Italian manufacture.

The 2007 book Venti angeli sopra Roma by Cesare De Simone speaks of a supposed admission of responsibility by the RAF in the postwar period.

The article by Raffaele Alessandrini on the 10–11 January 2011 issue of the Vatican newspaper L'Osservatore Romano says that the identity of those responsible has still not been completely clarified.

However, research published in 2016 proposes a more definitive identification of the bomber and presents an intriguing account of the motive behind it. Throughout 1943 the Italian Intelligence Service routinely intercepted and recorded telephone conversations to and from the Vatican.  On November 8, 1943 Ugo Guspini, one of the intelligence agents involved, recorded the conversation between Fr. Giuseppe and the Jesuit Pietro Tacchi Venturi.  In this verbatim account Fr. Giuseppe informed the Jesuit that he had just returned from the Viterbo Air Force base, north of Rome, where he had been told by someone who was present throughout the entire operation that the bombing was undertaken by Roberto Farinacci and a Roman pilot in an Italian Savoia-Marchetti aircraft with five bombs on board destined to knock out the Vatican Radio station because Farinacci believed it was transmitting military information to the Allies. This confirms the account given by Augusto Ferrara above and is further corroborated by Eitel Möllhausen, at the time chargé d'affaires at the German Embassy, Rome, who in his post-war memoir claimed that Farinacci was responsible and that Farinacci never denied it.

The report by Monsignor Walter S. Carroll (see above), who had just returned from Allied headquarters in Algeria, that he had been informed “very confidentially” that the bombing was due to an American pilot who had lost his way and that another American pilot had reported seeing an Allied plane dropping its load on the Vatican, correctly represented opinion at Allied headquarters, Algeria, at the time.  On November 8, 1943, Harold Macmillan, the then resident British Minister in Algiers, informed the British Foreign Office in a “Most Secret” telegram: “I think we probably did bomb the Vatican.”  On the night in question one of seven British Boston bombers, which had been in operation just north of Rome at the time the Vatican was bombed, developed engine trouble and dropped its bombs through clouds over an unknown location in order to lighten its load and return to base.  These it was thought must have been the bombs which fell on the Vatican.  But at the Foreign Office it was noted that it had been a clear and cloudless night over Rome when the Vatican was bombed.  And a subsequent confidential Air Ministry investigation into the incident established that the impaired Boston had actually dropped its bombs over Arce, some fifty miles southeast of Rome, and that neither it nor any other British aircraft in operation that night was responsible. The American pilot who witnessed the bombing probably saw the Savoia-Marchetti aircraft which, from a distance, is not dissimilar to the Martin Baltimore light bomber frequently used over Italy, and mistook it for an Allied aircraft.

As to the motive behind it, McGoldrick questions the claim it was intended to silence Vatican Radio.  The radio station's transmissions to the enemy and anti-Nazi broadcasts already ceased in May 1941 when Mussolini, under pressure from Hitler, threatened to invade the Vatican and close it down.  But from September 8, 1943, when Germany invaded and occupied Rome, both British and American media outlets unleashed a series of totally untrue (“False News”) reports that the Nazis had invaded the Vatican, imprisoned the Pope and arrested a number of Cardinals.  This inflamed Catholic opinion in Latin America, especially in Argentina, the last South American country to maintain diplomatic relations with Nazi Germany.  From September 1943 to the end of October 1943 the German Ambassador in Buenos Aires, Eric Otto Meynen, sent a series of urgent telegrams to Berlin warning that, in the light of these reports, Argentina was about to break off relations with Germany.  It was not enough, he said, to deny the allegations; a concrete counter action was needed. This, together with a carefully choreographed German propaganda operation blaming the British, suggests that when Farinacci bombed the Vatican with British bombs, he did so under instruction from his German handlers, anxious to discredit the Allies and counter harmful Allied propaganda which threatened their diplomatic relations with Argentina, the last friendly country open to them in Latin America.

Bombing of 1 March 1944 

There is less debate about the identity of the British plane that dropped bombs on the edge of Vatican City on 1 March 1944 as this was explicitly acknowledged, at least in private, by the British Air Ministry as an accidental bombing when one of its aircraft on a bombing raid over Rome dropped six bombs too close to the Vatican wall. It caused human casualties, killing a workman who was in the open and injuring a Dutch Augustinian in the College of Saint Monica. The low-yield bombs also caused damage to the Palace of the Holy Office, to the Oratory of Saint Peter, and to the Pontifical Urbanian College on the nearby Janiculum Hill. Claims persist, nevertheless, that this was an Italian plane which was seen to strike an obstacle, perhaps a tree on the Janiculum, after which it jettisoned its bombs, but crashed after hitting a house on Via del Gelsomino with its wing killing an elderly woman who lived inside. The Italian authorities quickly removed the wreckage and the dead pilot.

Monsignor Giulio Barbetta, who recounts his experience of this bombing, says that, while almost all the windows of the Holy Office building were shattered, the glass covering an image of Our Lady between it and the entrance to the Oratory of Saint Peter remained intact and the oratory itself suffered no more than the effects of shrapnel against its wall. This led to the placing  of sculptures of two shield-bearing angels to right and left of the image above an inscription that states: AB ANGELIS DEFENSA KAL. MART. A.D. MCMXLIV (Protected by angels, 1 March 1944 AD).

See also
 Vatican City in World War II

References

Conflicts in 1943
1940s in Rome
Explosions in 1943
Explosions in 1944
November 1943 events
March 1944 events
Pope Pius XII and World War II
Airstrikes
Battles and operations of World War II involving Italy
Modern history of Italy
Battles and conflicts without fatalities
World War II operations and battles of the Italian Campaign
False flag operations
Bombing
Bombing
Conflicts in 1944
Bombing